Allen Esteban Guevara Zúñiga (born 16 April 1989) is a Costa Rican professional football player as a winger. Played in the 2009 FIFA U-20 World Cup, where Costa Rica U-20 national football team, placed 4th after losing to Hungary in the match for the 3rd place.

References

Costa Rican footballers
Costa Rica international footballers
2011 Copa Centroamericana players
2011 CONCACAF Gold Cup players
2011 Copa América players
L.D. Alajuelense footballers
1989 births
Living people
Liga FPD players
2009 CONCACAF U-20 Championship players
Association football wingers